Ellis Fuller Lawrence (November 13, 1879 – February 27, 1946) was an American architect who worked primarily in the U.S. state of Oregon. In 1914, he became the co-founder and first dean of the University of Oregon's School of Architecture and Allied Arts, a position he held until his death.

Lawrence concurrently served as campus architect for the University of Oregon and designed many campus buildings, including Knight Library and the Jordan Schnitzer Museum of Art. Lawrence Hall on the university campus (which replaced his Architecture and Art Building of 1923) was named in his honor in 1956. His body of over 500 projects includes churches, residences, commercial and industrial buildings, funerary buildings, multi-family residences, and public buildings.

In 1988, the private residence he designed for Thomas A. Livesley, a prominent Salem, Oregon businessman and civic leader, was purchased through private donations and donated to the state and now serves as the Governor's official residence (Mahonia Hall).

Biography
Ellis F. Lawrence was born in Malden, Massachusetts and received his secondary education at Phillips Academy in Andover, Massachusetts graduating in 1897.  He received both his bachelor's and master's degrees at the Massachusetts Institute of Technology (MIT), the first school of architecture in the United States. After graduation in 1902, Lawrence worked for the Boston architectural firms Peabody & Stearns and Andrews, Jaques & Rantoul as well as for architects John Calvin Stevens and Constant-Désiré Despradelle before he left to travel in Europe. He was employed by the Boston architectural firm Codman & Despradelle in 1905.

In 1906, Codman & Despradelle (Boston), sent Lawrence to San Francisco to commence work there, but the 1906 San Francisco earthquake convinced him to stay in Portland, Oregon where he had stopped on the way. He lived in Portland the rest of his life and commuted to his work as dean and campus architect in Eugene.

He was associated with several Oregon-based architecture firms: MacNaughton, Raymond & Lawrence (1906–1910); Lawrence & Holford (1913–1928); Lawrence, Holford, Allyn & Bean (1928–1933); and  Lawrence, Holford, & Allyn (1933–1941).  Lawrence's final partnership, Lawrence & Lawrence (1944–1946), was with his son, Henry Abbott Lawrence.

Buildings designed by Lawrence

On the National Register of Historic Places

Eugene, Oregon
Alpha Phi Sorority House, University of Oregon
Chambers House
Knight Library, University of Oregon
Hope Abbey Mausoleum
Jordan Schnitzer Museum of Art, University of Oregon
 Women's Memorial Quadrangle (includes Gerlinger Hall, Susan Campbell Hall, and Hendricks Hall), University of Oregon

Portland, Oregon
Belle Court Apartments
Cumberland Apartments
Henry B. Dickson House
Lewis T. Gilliland House
Albert, Oscar, and Linda Heintz House
Dr. Harry M. Hendershott House
James Hickey House
Irvington Tennis Club
William H. Lewis Model House
Alexander D. McDougall House
Natt and Christena McDougall House
Henry B. Miller House
Paul C. Murphy House
Isaac Neuberger House
Harry T. Nicolai House
John V. G. Posey House
O. L. Price House
Samuel G. Reed House
Maurice Seitz House
Blaine Smith House
Stanley C.E. Smith House
Arthur Champlin Spencer and Margaret Fenton Spencer House
John A. Sprouse Jr. House
Alice Henderson Strong House
Fred E. Taylor House
Troy Laundry Building
Wells-Guthrie House
James E. Wheeler House

The Earl Bronaugh House

Other Oregon NRHP structures
Old Kappa Alpha Theta Sorority House, Corvallis
James M. and Paul R. Kelty House, Lafayette
Leaburg Powerhouse, part of the Leaburg Hydroelectric Project Historic District, Leaburg
Hall–Chaney House, Milwaukie
Elsinore Theater, Salem
Mahonia Hall, (Oregon Governor's mansion), Salem

Other buildings

Baker Middle School, Baker City
Cooley House, Lewis and Clark College, Portland
Franklin Building, Salem, contributing structure to the Salem Downtown Historic District
Martin House, Eugene 
McArthur Court, University of Oregon, Eugene
Mount Crest Abbey Mausoleum, Salem
Ocean View Abbey Mausoleum, Astoria
Sigma Alpha Epsilon fraternity house, Eugene
Donald R. Newberry House, Medford, Oregon
John Hughes house, Salem Oregon
Prentiss Hall, Whitman College, Walla Walla, Washington
Hunter Conservatory, Whitman College, Walla Walla, Washington

See also
National Register of Historic Places listings in Oregon

References

 Harmony in Diversity : The Architecture and Teaching of Ellis F. Lawrence. Edited by Michael Shellenbarger ; essays by Kimberly K. Lakin, Leland M. Roth, Michael Shellenbarger. Eugene, Or.: Museum of Art and the Historic Preservation Program, School of Architecture and Allied Arts, University of Oregon, 1989.
 Ritz, Richard Ellison.  "Lawrence, Ellis Fuller," Architects of Oregon; A Biographical Dictionary of Architects Deceased—19th and 20th Centuries. Portland, OR: Lair Hill Publishing, 2002.

External links
Ellis Lawrence Building Survey, from University of Oregon Libraries
Harmony in Diversity : The Architecture and Teaching of Ellis F. Lawrence.
Architecture of Ellis F. Lawrence National Register of Historic Places multiple property submission Pt. 1

Ellis F. Lawrence, in The Architecture of the University of Oregon: A History, Bibliography, and Research Guide
Ellis F. Lawrence, The Oregon Encyclopedia, by Elizabeth Walton Potter.

1879 births
1946 deaths
Architects from Portland, Oregon
People from Malden, Massachusetts
Fellows of the American Institute of Architects
20th-century American architects